Ylivieska sub-region is a subdivision of Northern Ostrobothnia and one of the Sub-regions of Finland since 2009.

Municipalities
 Alavieska
 Kalajoki
 Merijärvi
 Oulainen
 Sievi
 Ylivieska

Politics
Results of the 2018 Finnish presidential election:

 Sauli Niinistö   55.9%
 Matti Vanhanen   14.5%
 Paavo Väyrynen   10.8%
 Laura Huhtasaari   8.4%
 Pekka Haavisto   5.4%
 Merja Kyllönen   3.0%
 Tuula Haatainen   1.8%
 Nils Torvalds   0.2%

Sub-regions of Finland
Geography of North Ostrobothnia